Peter J. Hirschfeld is an American physicist, currently a Distinguished Professor at the University of Florida and an Elected Fellow of the American Physical Society. His lab is studying the problems of  modern many-body theory associated with superconductivity and quantum materials.

Education

Hirschfeld was an undergraduate and graduate student at Princeton University. He then took post-doctoral research positions
at the Technical University of Munich and at Stanford University before joining the
faculty at the University of Florida.

Research
Hirschfeld and his research group investigate the theory behind superconductivity, electronic
correlations and disorder. A particular emphasis is the study of new problems posed by the discovery in February 2008 of high-temperature Fe-based superconducting materials.

Honors
Hirschfeld was the University of Florida Teacher/Scholar of the Year 2012-13.

He was elected Fellow of the American Physical Society in 2004, nominated by the Division of Condensed Matter Physics
"For distinguished contributions to the theory of disordered unconventional superconductors which helped to identify d-wave pairing in the high-temperature superconductors."

In January 2022, he was one of three co-winners of the John Bardeen Prize.

References

Living people
Fellows of the American Physical Society
University of Florida faculty
21st-century American physicists
1957 births